The 2020 Gold Coast Titans Season is the 14th season competing in the 2020 NRL season. The team was coached by Justin Holbrook in his debut season.

Fixtures

Pre-season

Regular season

References

Gold Coast Titans seasons
Gold Coast Titans season